Martha Steffy Browne (anglicized from Martha Stephanie Braun née Herrmann; 12 December 1898 – 2 March 1990) was an Austrian American economist. A student of Ludwig von Mises, she earned a doctorate in political economy in 1921 from the University of Vienna, one of the first women to do so. Of Jewish descent, Browne emigrated to the United States in 1939, later becoming a professor of economics at Brooklyn College (1947–1969).

References

External links 
 Memorial website at University of Vienna

1898 births
1990 deaths
American people of Austrian-Jewish descent
Jewish emigrants from Nazi Germany to the United States
Austrian economists
Austrian women economists
University of Vienna alumni
Brooklyn College faculty